Ulrich Beyer (23 July 1947 – 20 October 1988) was an amateur light-welterweight boxer from East Germany. Between 1971 and 1977 he won four medals at the European championships, including a gold in 1971; at the 1974 World Championships he placed third. He competed at the 1972 and 1976 Olympics, and was eliminated by Sugar Ray Seales in the first bout in 1972 and by Sugar Ray Leonard in a quarterfinal in 1976.

1976 Olympic results
Below is the record of Ulrich Beyer, an East German light welterweight boxer who competed at the 1976 Montreal Olympics:

 Round of 64: defeated C.C. Machaiah (India) by decision, 5-0
 Round of 32: defeated Jesus Navas (Venezuela) by decision, 5-0
 Round of 16: defeated Francisco de Jesus (Brazil) by decision, 5-0
 Quarterfinal: lost to Ray Leonard (United States) by decision, 0-5

References

External links
 

1947 births
1988 deaths
Boxers at the 1972 Summer Olympics
Boxers at the 1976 Summer Olympics
Olympic boxers of East Germany
East German male boxers
Recipients of the Patriotic Order of Merit in bronze
People from Templin
AIBA World Boxing Championships medalists
Light-welterweight boxers
Sportspeople from Brandenburg